Artistri Sud is a registered charity that provides entrepreneurship training to women artisans in developing countries. The organization was founded in 2009 by Jennifer Lonergan and has implemented entrepreneurship training programs for women artisans and artisan groups in countries including Bolivia, Chile, Cambodia, India and Zimbabwe.

Operations 
Based in Montreal, Artistri Sud has built a following in Canada and abroad, using mainstream and social media platforms to raise awareness. The organization also hosts an annual fundraising event around International Women’s Day each year, recognizing local Montreal entrepreneurs for their work.

The organization’s founder and executive director, Jennifer Lonergan, is the organization's only paid employee. All other positions are filled by volunteers and interns. Artistri Sud has around 50 volunteers, and about 90% of them are women.

All donations made and grants received are used to fund the entrepreneurship training programs the organization implements in developing countries to empower women.

History

Beginnings 
Prior to launching the nonprofit, executive director Lonergan opened a retail store in 2008, Artistri Atelier Boutique. The idea was to support women craftspeople both in Canada and in the developing world by promoting and selling their work in the store. The retail store is now closed.

Today 
Today the nonprofit’s main activity is the implementation of its entrepreneurship training programs in the developing world, to empower women artisans to run their own micro-enterprises and earn a sustainable income to support themselves and their families.

References 

Entrepreneurship organizations